"Bartender" is a song by T-Pain, released as the second single from his second album, Epiphany. The song debuted on the Billboard Hot 100 chart on the issue date of June 16, 2007 at No. 97 and peaked at No. 5 on September 22, 2007, making it T-Pain's fourth consecutive top 10 hit on the Billboard Hot 100 as well as Akon's ninth top 10 hit on the same chart. In 2008, the song was nominated for a Grammy for Best R&B Performance by a Duo or Group.

Music video
The video, directed by Erik White, premiered on Yahoo! Music on June 13, 2007, as the Bonus Video. It features T-Pain dancing in front of a bar and flirting with the "Bartender". BET's Access Granted also premiered the video on June 13, 2007. 

The video was filmed in the Fever Nightclub - Atlanta, Georgia.

Charts

Weekly charts

Year-end charts

Certifications

Remixes
There are remixes featuring The-Dream, Chingy and Trae.

References

2007 singles
2007 songs
T-Pain songs
Akon songs
Song recordings produced by T-Pain
Songs written by Akon
Songs written by T-Pain
Music videos directed by Erik White
Konvict Muzik singles

it:Bartender